Arieh Rubin (born 1952) is an Israeli paralympic swimming champion. He competed at the 1968, 1972 and 1976, winning 9 medals

Life 
Wengier was born in 1952 and contracted polio when he was nine months old. He was trained at the Israel Sports Center for the Disabled.

At the 1968 Summer Paralympics, he won a gold medal with Baruch Hagai in the table tennis men's doubles tournament and three medals in swimming: 2 silver and one bronze. He won silver medals in the breaststroke swimming tournament for 100m and in the 3X25 individual medley tournament. He won the bronze medal in the 50m breaststroke swimming tournament.

At the 1972 Summer Paralympics, he won a gold medal in the 100m breaststroke swimming tournament and two silver medals: one in the 100m freestyle swimming tournament and another for the 3X50 individual medley. 

At the 1976 Summer Paralympics, he won a gold medal as a member of the swimming team competing at the 4X100 medley relay and a silver medal as a member of Israel's wheelchair basketball team. 

In 2007, Rubin was sentenced to four years in probation after a legal proceeding concerning allegations of indecent acts with a minor.

Rubin was married to paralympic athlete Zipora Rubin-Rosenbaum. He is divorced and a father of three.

References 

1952 births
Living people
Israeli people of Libyan-Jewish descent
Israeli male swimmers
Israeli men's wheelchair basketball players
Wheelchair basketball players at the 1976 Summer Paralympics
Israeli table tennis players
Table tennis players at the 1968 Summer Paralympics
Paralympic swimmers of Israel
Swimmers at the 1968 Summer Paralympics
Swimmers at the 1972 Summer Paralympics
Swimmers at the 1976 Summer Paralympics
Paralympic gold medalists for Israel
Paralympic silver medalists for Israel
Paralympic bronze medalists for Israel
Medalists at the 1968 Summer Paralympics
Medalists at the 1972 Summer Paralympics
Medalists at the 1976 Summer Paralympics
Paralympic medalists in swimming